Plumatellidae is a family of bryozoans belonging to the order Plumatellida.

Genera:
 Australella
 Gelatinella Toriumi, 1955
 Hyalinella Jullien, 1885
 Leptoblastella Vinogradov, 2004
 Plumatella Lamarck, 1816
 Plumatellites Fric, 1901
 Rumarcanella Hirose & Mawatari, 2011
 Stolella Annandale, 1909
 Swarupella Shrivastava, 1981

References

Bryozoan families